William Dyer (born 1805, England; died 17 June 1865, Kendal, Westmorland) was an English cricketer who was associated with Kent and made his first-class debut in 1830.

References

Bibliography
 

1805 births
1865 deaths
English cricketers
English cricketers of 1826 to 1863
Gentlemen of Kent cricketers